The Langdale Horseshoe is an annual Lake District fell race that starts and finishes at the Old Dungeon Ghyll. The course climbs to Stickle Tarn before heading to Thunacar Knott, Esk Hause shelter, Bowfell, Crinkle Crags and Pike of Blisco. It includes much rough and rocky ground. On the descent from Crinkle Crags, many runners negotiate the Bad Step, although it can be avoided depending on route choice. The race often presents navigational difficulties, especially in poor visibility.

History
The Langdale Horseshoe was first held in 1973, when it was organised by Dave Meek of Ambleside and the Langdale Fell Race Association. It was sponsored by Quiggin's Kendal Mint Cake. In 1977, a shorter ladies’ race up Pike of Blisco was held in conjunction with the Langdale Horseshoe but from 1978, women were allowed to compete over the full course.

Due to a lack of volunteers to help with race organisation, the 1982 race was not run over the usual course but on a route up and down Scafell Pike. No race was held the next year but it was relaunched in 1984 by Ambleside AC. In 1986, the race had over five hundred runners and in order to reduce the strain on the organisational resources and the local area, it was decided that from the following year, only pre-entered competitors would be allowed to take part.

Langdale is one of the races in the Lakeland Classics Trophy series which was inaugurated in 2002.

In its early years, the race was held in September, but it now takes place in October. It has been one of the counting races in the English Fell Running Championships several times. As it takes place relatively late in the season, it is often the last race in the series on such occasions and can play a significant part in the championship results. In 2005, for example, Rob Hope was joint winner in the English Championships due in part to his triumph at the Langdale Horseshoe immediately after returning from the World Mountain Running Trophy in New Zealand.

Results
Langdale has one of the oldest course records in fell running, with a time of 1:55:03 set by Andy Styan in 1977. Styan felt that he had been able to run so quickly due to the good conditions and the very strong competition on the day. Styan, Billy Bland, Alan McGee and Mike Short all finished in between 1:55:03 and 1:56:08 that year. Since then, the fastest winning time has been 1:56:13 by Gavin Bland in 1997.

A new women's record of 2:22:50 was set by Victoria Wilkinson in 2016, beating the previous best of Helene Diamantides which had stood since 1992.

Billy Bland won five time between 1978 and 1987 and his nephew Gavin Bland won five times between 1990 and 2003. In the women’s race, Pauline Haworth, Ruth Pickvance and Kelli Roberts have the most wins with three each.

The winners have been as follows:

Note 1: Pike of Blisco route.

Note 2: Scafell Pike route.

References

Fell running competitions in Cumbria